The 1989 Virginia Cavaliers men's soccer team represented the University of Virginia during the 1989 NCAA Division I men's soccer season. The Cavaliers, playing their 49th season of existence, won their first ever national championship, which was a co-title with Santa Clara. It was often considered the start to the Cavaliers' early 1990s dynasty run in college soccer.

Schedule 

|-
!colspan=6 style="background:#0d3268; color:#ff7c00;"| Regular Season
|-

|-

|-

|-

|-

|-

|-

|-

|-

|-

|-

|-

|-

|-

|-

|-

|-

|-

|-

|-

|-
!colspan=6 style="background:#0d3268; color:#ff7c00;"| ACC Tournament
|-

|-
!colspan=6 style="background:#0d3268; color:#ff7c00;"| NCAA Tournament
|-
|-

|-

|-

|-

References 
 1989 Results

Virginia Cavaliers men's soccer seasons
Virginia Cavaliers
Virginia Soccer, men's
NCAA Division I Men's Soccer Tournament-winning seasons
NCAA Division I Men's Soccer Tournament College Cup seasons